Brendan Evans won in the final 6–7(4–7), 6–4, 7–6(7–4), against Ilija Bozoljac.

Seeds

Draw

Finals

Top half

Bottom half

References
 Main Draw
 Qualifying Draw

Aegon Trophy - Singles
2009 Singles